Dark Pool is the third studio album by Black Rain, released on August 12, 2014 by Blackest Ever Black.

Reception

In their review of Dark Pool, Fact said "in an age where much dance music is set on exploring lurid, hyperreal visions of emotion and sensuality, there's something quite enervating about Black Rain's refusal of sensation: its unyielding adherence to a darkside mentality into which no warmth can leak." Pitchfork Media said the "songs at album’s center are the most visceral" and "throughout, the productions of Argabright and Shimokawa move deep into queasy dark ambient territory, yet there’s a noir-ish, cinematic sense pervading every track The Quietus also commended the album, saying "standing on the previous work of Black Rain, Dark Pool reads as an evolution rather that a sudden jump to the present, and smart sequencing increases the overall effectiveness of the music to lend a narrative feel to the album."

Track listing

Personnel 
Adapted from the Dark Pool liner notes.

Black Rain
 Stuart Argabright – instruments, production

Production and design
 Oliver Chapoy – co-producer, engineering, mixing
 Matt Colton – mastering
 Oliver Smith – design

Release history

References

External links 
 
 
 Dark Pool at Bandcamp
 Dark Pool at iTunes

2014 albums
Black Rain (band) albums